Souk Ahras (Berber: Tagast; ancient name: Thagast) is a municipality in Algeria. It is the capital of Souk Ahras Province. The Numidian city of Thagaste (or Tagaste), on whose ruins Souk Ahras was built, was the birthplace of Augustine of Hippo and  a center of Berber culture. It was a city of great culture, described as the very hub of civilization.

Etymology
The name derives from the Arabic word souk which means "market", and the Chaoui Berber word ahra (plural ahras) which means "lion", in reference to the Barbary lions which existed in the neighboring forests until their extinction in 1930; hence Souk Ahras means "market of lions" (see also Oran (Wahran) and Tahert for names with a related etymology).

 Number of wild animals killed in Souk Ahras between 1877 and 1892 

Source : Dr.Rouquette, Monographie de la commune Mixte de Souk Ahras, 1904, p. 274 

The old name of the Numidian city of Thagaste, derives from the Berber Thagoust, which means the bag, given that the site of the town is located at the foot of a mountain surrounded by three peaks in the form of a bag containing the city. Subsequently, when the Arabic language entered in the region it was called Soukara. In other sources it is cited as the Palace of the African, according to Al-Masudi.

History

Prehistory
The town of Souk Ahras, as its region, experienced Aterian culture from the end of the Middle Palaeolithic to the early upper Palaeolithic Ages. After the Aterian, Souk Ahras was inhabited by people of the Capsian culture. Many stone tools dating to this period have been discovered. Stemmed arrows were found on the site of present-day Souk Ahras, but also in Tiffech and Taoura, not far from it.

Antiquity
It was the birthplace of Augustine of Hippo (born 13 November 354 CE) to Monica of Hippo (Saint Monica), he later the Bishop of Hippo and Saint Augustine. Souk Ahras (Thagaste) has played an important role in the political and cultural history of the region because of its strategic position at the crossroads of Numide, Ancient Roman, and Berber civilizations. It was the location of military fortifications (Madaure, Tiffech, Khemissa...) and urban centers.

Thagaste
Tagaste was a town of Numidia in Roman North Africa, on the banks of the Oued Hamise river.  Augustine of Hippo was born here.
The Roman city is identified with ruins of  Tajilt  near Souk Ahras, Algeria.

The Numidian city of Thagaste or Tagaste, on whose ruins Souk Ahras was built, was situated in the north-eastern highlands of Numidia.

Thagaste became a Roman municipium. The city was mentioned by Pliny the Elder. As a municipium, Thagaste was not settled by Roman Italian immigrants, but was inhabited by Romanized native Berbers.

Modern era
In 1830 Souk Ahras became a colonial settlement of French Algeria (1830–1962). Late 19th century connection via the Algerian Railway, and 20th century iron ore and phosphate mining, brought some modern significance and prosperity to the town.

During the Algerian War of Independence (1954–1962), Souk Ahras housed the Ouled Bechiah Mounts as an autonomous military base of the Army of National Liberation (ALN), called "Basis of the East".

Geography

Relief and hydrography 
The town of Souk Ahras is located in a basin surrounded by wooded mountains as the Djebel Beni Salah or Djebel Ouled Moumen.

Souk Ahras is crossed by a major North African river, the Medjerda.

Districts of Souk Ahras 

 Souk Ahras
 Hamma-Loulou
 An-Nasser
 Diar Ezzarga
 1er Novembre 1954
 5 Juillet
 17 Octobre
 20 Août
 26 Avril 1958
 El-Allaouia
 Ibn Rochd
 Kouicem Abdelhak
 Sidi Messaoud
 Sidi Okba
 Et-Tagtaguia

Climate
Algiers has a hot-summer Mediterranean climate (Köppen climate classification Csa) with warm summers and mild winters. Its proximity to the Mediterranean Sea aids in moderating the city's temperatures. As a result, Souk Ahras usually does not see the extreme temperatures that are experienced in the adjacent interior deserts. The climate of Algiers, like that of other Atlas cities, features wet winters and dry summers.

Demographics 
The inhabitants of the town of Souk Ahras are of Berber origin. They are mainly from the different regions of the wilaya of Souk Ahras and neighboring wilayas. The first tribes having established in Souk Ahras were known as the Papiria, or Babiria from the name of Berber. They were composed of Causses and Syliactae.

The tribes of Mousoulami and Kirina lived there. Including the other tribes: the Hnanchas that grew the most and the Hrakta all of them have Berber origins. These tribes lived in tents and practiced nomadism. They have established later and founded cities for each of them, including the town of Souk Ahras, the old Thagaste.

Tourism 

Tourism in Souk Ahras focuses largely on a variety of historical and natural sites. In recent years it has become a destination for culture and health tourism. Souk Ahras, also known as Thagaste, is one of the most beautiful cities in Algeria, especially in the spring and winter, attracting many tourists. In Ain Zana and the annotated, or beautiful architectural features such as Al-Aman mosque, the Thagaste bridge in the center of the city, the olive tree of St. Augustine, the corner of Sidi Massoud, the cultural center.

Souk Ahras is located in the east of Algeria, near the border with Tunisia.

Types of tourism in the state

 Religious tourism
 Medical Tourism
 Sport tourism
 Shopping tourism
 Recreational tourism
 Cultural tourism
 Roaming tourism
 Eco-tourism
 Adventure tourism
 Auto and bicycle tourism
 Exhibition tourism

People related 
 Alypius of Thagaste, Christian bishop celebrated on August 15
 Apuleius, Hellenized Numidian author
 Augustine of Hippo, Berber Christian author and Doctor of the Church
 Said Boualam, Algerian colonel in the French Army
 Chabane Boualleg, Algerian psychologist and senator
 Martianus Capella, Hellenized Roman author and Latin scholar
 Firmus and Rusticus, Christian martyrs of the 4th century
 Taoufik Makhloufi, middle distance runner and gold medalist at the 2012 Summer Olympics
 Saint Monica, Berber Christian and mother of Augustine
 Charles Pellat, French scholar and historian
 Tacfarinas, Numidian Berber who resisted the Roman invasions
 Ahmad al-Tifashi, Algerian author
 Tahar Ouettar, Algerian author
 Kateb Yacine, Algerian author

References

Bibliography

External links

 website
 www.souk-ahras: Souk Ahras Info
 Panoramio — Image gallery about Souk Shras and its region
 

Province seats of Algeria
Communes of Souk Ahras Province
Roman towns and cities in Algeria
Cities in Algeria
Algeria